Erythrina velutina is a species of leguminous tree. It is indigenous to Brazil, Peru, Ecuador, Colombia, Venezuela, and Hispaniola and has been introduced to much of the Caribbean, Uganda, and Sri Lanka. It also occurs on the Galápagos Islands, but whether it is indigenous or introduced there is unclear. In Brazil, it occurs on plains and near rivers in the arid parts of the northeast of the country and is commonly known as "mulungu".  Erythrina velutina grows as a large tree to around 10 m (30 ft) high and has short spines on the stem. It is perennial.

Taxonomy
The species was first described in 1801 by Carl Ludwig Willdenow. Henry Nicholas Ridley described Erythrina aurantiaca as a species from Fernando de Noronha off the northeastern coast of Brazil, but this tree is now seen as only a form of E. velutina, Erythrina velutina f. aurantiaca.

Blooming
On Fernando de Noronha, it flowers in the dry season. There are 10 to 26 flowers per inflorescence, of which one to eight open each day. Flowers open early in the morning, between 6 and 6:30 am. They remain open for two days, but produce nectar only the first day. All native land vertebrates of the island, including the Noronha dove (Zenaida auriculata noronha), vireo (Vireo gracilirostris), elaenia (Elaenia ridleyana), and skink (Trachylepis atlantica), pollinate the species on Fernando de Noronha. No other Erythrina species is pollinated by doves or lizards.

Uses
In northeastern Brazil, the bark of E. velutina is used in traditional medicine against insomnia, convulsions, nervous coughs, and nervous excitation. Harvesting of bark for medicinal purposes poses a threat to the survival of the species; for this reason, several scientific studies of the medicinal effects of tree have used extract from the leaves instead. In laboratory mice and rats, E. velutina extract prolongs sleep, inhibits motorial activity, and inhibits memory.

Erythrina velutina contains the indole based alkaloid Hypaphorine which has shown sleep promoting effects in mice

Toxicity
Its seeds are similar to beans, but are red and toxic. The seeds should not be ingested by the risk of death.

Gallery

References

Literature cited 
2010. Erythrina velutina. LegumeWeb, International Legume Database & Information Service, version 10.01. Retrieved March 20, 2010.
 
 
 
 
 
 

velutina
Flora of South America